The Main Event is a 1999 video of The Main Event Tour by singers Olivia Newton-John, John Farnham and Anthony Warlow.

Track listing
"Overture"
"Age Of Reason" [JF, ONJ, AW]
"Phantom of The Opera" [AW, ONJ, JF]
"A Little More Love" [ONJ, JF, AW]
"This is The Moment" [Anthony]
"Hopelessly Devoted to You" [Olivia]
"Everytime You Cry" [John]
"Please Don't Ask Me" [ONJ, JF]
"You're the One That I Want" [ONJ, JF]
"The Long And Winding Road" [AW, ONJ]
"Take Me Home Country Roads" [AW, ONJ]
"I Honestly Love You" [ONJ, AW]
"Love Is A Gift" [ONJ, AW]
"That's Life/Bad Habits" [AW, JF]
"Granada" [AW, JF]
"You've Lost That Loving Feeling" [AW, ONJ, JF]
"Summer Nights" [AW, ONJ, JF]
"If Not For You" [ONJ, AW, JF]
"Let Me Be There" [ONJ, AW, JF]
"Raindrops Keep Falling On My Head" [ONJ, AW, JF]
"Jolene" [ONJ, AW, JF]
"Hearts On Fire" [ONJ, AW, JF]
"Don't You Know it's Magic" [ONJ, AW, JF]
"You're The Voice" [JF, ONJ, AW]

External links
 

Olivia Newton-John video albums
Live video albums
Olivia Newton-John live albums
1998 video albums
1998 live albums